Alepis is a genus of flowering plants belonging to the family Loranthaceae. It is monotypic, being represented by the single species Alepis flavida.

This mistletoe was first described in 1852 as Loranthus flavidus by Joseph Dalton Hooker, but in 1894 Philippe Édouard Léon Van Tieghem transferred it to the genus, Alepis.

Its native range is New Zealand.

Conservation status
It is currently (2017) declared "At Risk - Declining" under the New Zealand Threatened species system, with the qualifier C(1) implying that there are greater than 10000 mature individuals with an expected decline of from 10% to 70%, and with an area of occupancy which is less than 10,000 ha which is expected to decline by from 10% to 50%.

References

Loranthaceae
Loranthaceae genera
Monotypic Santalales genera
Taxa named by Joseph Dalton Hooker
Taxa named by Philippe Édouard Léon Van Tieghem